Rudieon Sylvan (born 17 January 1979) is a Grenadian track and field athlete who competed in the men's 400m at the 2000 Summer Olympics. He ran a 48.17, good for 7th in his heat. His best-ever time was a 46.62 finish in 1999.

References

1979 births
Grenadian male sprinters
Athletes (track and field) at the 2000 Summer Olympics
Olympic athletes of Grenada
Living people